Alma–Marceau is a station on Line 9 of the Paris Métro, named after the Pont de l'Alma (Alma Bridge) and the Avenue Marceau. The station opened on 27 May 1923 with the extension of the line from Trocadéro to Saint-Augustin.

The Battle of Alma was a Franco-British victory against the Russians in the Crimean War in 1854. General François Séverin Marceau-Desgraviers (1769–1796) fought the Revolt in the Vendée during the French Revolution.

Places of interest 

Diana, Princess of Wales died as a result of a car crash in the tunnel under the Pont de l'Alma in 1997. The square east of the metro entrance is officially named Place Diana, in her memory.
The Zouave, a sculpture of a Zouave by Georges Diebolt, is attached to the upstream side of the Pont de l'Alma. Parisians measure the depth of floods by noting the proportion of the statue that is under water.
Near the station are the cabaret of the Crazy Horse Saloon and the Museum of Modern Art of the City of Paris in the Palais de Tokyo.
The Place d'Alma is at the western end of the Cours Albert Ier et Cours La Reine, which contain some statues commemorating characters symbolising the relations between France and other countries.
The starting point of visits to the Paris sewers in the vicinity of the Eiffel Tower is on the left bank of the Seine.

Station layout

Gallery

References

Roland, Gérard (2003). Stations de métro. D’Abbesses à Wagram. Éditions Bonneton.

Paris Métro stations in the 8th arrondissement of Paris
Railway stations in France opened in 1923